The 1987 Berlin Marathon was the 14th running of the annual marathon race held in Berlin, West Germany, held on 4 October. Tanzania's Suleiman Nyambui won the men's race in 2:11:11 hours, while the women's race was won by West Germany's Kerstin Preßler in 2:31:22. Gregor Golombek (1:46:52) and Margit Quell (2:21:29), both of West Germany, won the men's and women's wheelchair races. A total of 12,674 runners finished the race, comprising 11,651 men and 1023 women.

Results

Men

Women

References 

 Results. Association of Road Racing Statisticians. Retrieved 2020-06-03.

External links 
 Official website

1987
Berlin Marathon
1980s in West Berlin
Berlin Marathon
Berlin Marathon